Camembert is a commune in the Orne department in north-western France.

It is the place where camembert cheese originated.

Camembert has been called "The largest small village in France." This is because the area of the commune itself is out of proportion to the center of the village which consists of the Cheese Museum (in the shape of a Camembert cheese), the Town Hall (Mairie), the Church of St Anne, the Ferme Président (a museum), Beamoncel (the house where Marie Harel, the creator of camembert cheese lived) and 3 other small houses.

History
The village is most noted for the early development of camembert cheese by Marie Harel in 1791.

Population

See also
 Communes of the Orne department

References

External links

 Maison du Camembert

Communes of Orne